is a Kofun period burial mound, located in the Mikagezuka neighborhood of Higashinada-ku, Kobe,  Hyōgo Prefecture, in the Kansai region of Japan. The tumulus was designated a National Historic Site of Japan in 1922.

Overview
It is located on an alluvial fan formed by the Ishiyagawa River, and is one of the several early Kofun period burial mounds distributed on the coastal plain at the southern foot of Mount Rokkō. The total length of the tumulus, which had fukiishi its surface, is estimated to be about 70 meters after the restoration. It is believed to be the oldest burial mound at the southern foot of Mount Rokkō. The 100-meter  is about 2,000 meters west of this location, and the 80-meter   is about 1,500 meters to the east. Unable to choose between the two, she commits suicide and the two suitors both follow her into death. 

Since 1979, the tumulus has been restored and maintained as a historic park. The tumulus is about a three-minute walk from Ishiyagawa Station on the Hanshin Electric Railway Hanshin Main Line.

See also
List of Historic Sites of Japan (Hyōgo)

References

External links

Kobe City home page
Hyogo Prefectural Museum of History

History of Hyōgo Prefecture
Kobe
Historic Sites of Japan
Archaeological sites in Japan
Kofun